Eric of Swealand ; Swedish Hertig Erik av Svealand - may refer to:

 Eric, Duke of Swealand and the Smallands, prince 1251, son of Princess Ingeborg and Jarl Birger
 Eric, Duke of Södermanland, prince 1282, also Duke of Swealand